At least two ships of the Argentine Navy have been named Drummond:

 , a  commissioned in 1937 and decommissioned in 1964.
 , a  ordered from a French shipyard by South Africa she was launched in 1977 as SAS Good Hope but never delivered. She was purchased by Argentina and renamed in 1978.

Argentine Navy ship names